The women's 800 metres event at the 1966 European Indoor Games was held on 27 March in Dortmund.

Results

References

800 metres at the European Athletics Indoor Championships
800